Woodmere is an unincorporated community and census-designated place (CDP) in Jefferson Parish, Louisiana, United States. The population was 12,080 at the 2010 census, and 11,238 at the 2020 census. It is part of the New Orleans–Metairie–Kenner metropolitan statistical area.

Geography
Woodmere is located on the east side of Jefferson Parish at  (29.857588, -90.078051). It is bordered to the northeast by Harvey and to the southwest by Estelle. At its southeast corner it touches the community of Belle Chasse in Plaquemines Parish. The eastern border of Woodmere is the Harvey Canal.

Demographics

According to the 2020 United States census, there were 11,238 people, 3,536 households, and 2,508 families residing in the CDP. In 2019, the American Community Survey estimated 10,173 people and 3,536 households lived in the CDP. The racial and ethnic makeup was 78.8% Black or African American, 10.7% non-Hispanic white, 0.2% American Indian and Alaska Native, 4.0% Asian, 0.9% some other race, 3.0% two or more races, and 10.7% Hispanic and Latino American of any race in 2019; and in 2020, its racial and ethnic makeup was 79.28% Black or African American, 6.2% non-Hispanic white, 0.16% American Indian and Alaska Native, 3.62% Asian, 0.03% Pacific Islander, 3.03% multiracial or of another race, and 7.69% Hispanic and Latino American of any race. In 2019, the median household income was $54,363 and 19.3% of the population lived at or below the poverty line.

Education
Residents are assigned to schools in the Jefferson Parish Public Schools system.

Most residents are zoned to Woodmere Elementary while some are zoned to Congetta Trippe Janet Elementary in Estelle and others are zoned to Ella C. Pittman Elementary in Marrero. In September 2020, the school recommended expulsion, later changed to suspension, when a teacher saw a BB gun in the room while a student was part of an online class (due to the COVID-19 pandemic) and school cited a prohibition of weapons in schools, deeming the child's home as school property.

All residents are zoned to Truman Middle School in Estelle. Some residents are zoned to John Ehret High School and some are zoned to Helen Cox High School in Harvey. In regards to advanced studies academies, residents are zoned to the Marrero Academy.

References

Census-designated places in Louisiana
Census-designated places in Jefferson Parish, Louisiana
Census-designated places in New Orleans metropolitan area